HMS Mildura was a  built for the Royal Navy in the late 1880s. Originally named HMS Pelorus, she was renamed after an Australian town in April 1890. Per the Imperial Defense Act of 1887, she served primarily in Australian waters.

Captain Henry Leah was in command from April 1897 until April 1900, when Captain Henry C. A. Baynes arrived in Australia on board  to take command of the ship. He was succeeded by Captain Charles Kingsmill in September 1900. She was part of the naval escort for the visit of the Duke and Duchess of Cornwall and York (later King George V and Queen Mary) to New Zealand aboard the chartered Royal liner HMS Ophir during 1901.

She was sold to Garnham, London for scrap in 1906 for £7,200.

Notes

References
 
 
 

 

1889 ships
Ships built by Armstrong Whitworth
Ships built on the River Tyne
Pearl-class cruisers
Victorian-era cruisers of the United Kingdom